The avocado (Persea americana) is a medium-sized, evergreen tree in the laurel family (Lauraceae). It is native to the Americas and was first domesticated by Mesoamerican tribes more than 5,000 years ago. Then as now it was prized for its large and unusually oily fruit. The tree likely originated in the highlands bridging south-central Mexico and Guatemala. Its fruit, sometimes also referred to as an alligator or avocado pear, is botanically a large berry containing a single large seed. Avocado trees are partly self-pollinating, and are often propagated through grafting to maintain consistent fruit output. Avocados are presently cultivated in the tropical and Mediterranean climates of many countries. Mexico is the world's leading producer of avocados as of 2020, supplying nearly 30% of the global harvest in that year. 

The fruit of domestic varieties have smooth, buttery, golden-green flesh when ripe. Depending on the cultivar, avocados have green, brown, purplish, or black skin, and may be pear-shaped, egg-shaped, or spherical. For commercial purposes the fruits are picked while unripe and ripened after harvesting. The nutrient density and extremely high fat content of avocado flesh are useful to a variety of cuisines and are often eaten to enrich vegetarian diets.

In major production regions like Chile, Mexico and California the water demands of avocado farms place strain on local sources. Avocado production is also implicated in other externalities, including deforestation and human rights concerns associated with the partial control of their production in Mexico by organized crime. Global warming is expected to result in significant changes to the suitable growing zones for avocados, and place additional pressures on the locales in which they are produced due to heat waves and drought.

Botany 

Flower 
Panicles of flowers with deciduous bracts arise from new growth or the axils of leaves. The tree flowers thousands of blossoms every year. They have no petals but instead 2 whorls of 3 pale-green or greenish-yellow downy perianth lobes, each blossom has 9 stamens with 2 basal orange nectar glands.

Fruit 
The avocado fruit is a climacteric, single-seeded berry, due to the imperceptible endocarp covering the seed, rather than a drupe.

The species produces various cultivars with larger, fleshier fruits with a thinner exocarp because of selective breeding by humans.

History 
Persea americana, or the avocado, possibly originated in the Tehuacan Valley in the state of Puebla, Mexico, although fossil evidence suggests similar species were much more widespread millions of years ago. However, there is evidence for three possible separate domestications of the avocado, resulting in the currently recognized Mexican (aoacatl), Guatemalan (quilaoacatl), and West Indian (tlacacolaocatl) landraces. The Mexican and Guatemalan landraces originated in the highlands of those countries, while the West Indian landrace is a lowland variety that ranges from Guatemala, Costa Rica, Colombia, Ecuador to Peru, achieving a wide range through human agency before the arrival of the Europeans. The three separate landraces were most likely to have already intermingled in pre-Columbian America and were described in the Florentine Codex.

The earliest residents of northern coastal Peru were living in temporary camps in an ancient wetland and eating avocados, along with chilies, mollusks, sharks, birds, and sea lions. The oldest discovery of an avocado pit comes from Coxcatlan Cave, dating from around 9,000 to 10,000 years ago. Other caves in the Tehuacan Valley from around the same time period also show early evidence for the presence and consumption of avocado. There is evidence for avocado use at Norte Chico civilization sites in Peru by at least 3,200 years ago and at Caballo Muerto in Peru from around 3,800 to 4,500 years ago.

The native, undomesticated variety is known as a criollo, and is small, with dark black skin, and contains a large seed. It probably coevolved with extinct megafauna. In 1982, evolutionary biologist Daniel H. Janzen concluded that the avocado is an example of an "evolutionary anachronism", a fruit adapted for ecological relationship with now-extinct large mammals (such as giant ground sloths or gomphotheres). Most large fleshy fruits serve the function of seed dispersal, accomplished by their consumption by large animals. There are some reasons to think that the fruit, with its mildly toxic pit, may have coevolved with Pleistocene megafauna to be swallowed whole and excreted in their dung, ready to sprout. No extant native animal is large enough to effectively disperse avocado seeds in this fashion.

The avocado tree also has a long history of cultivation in Central and South America, likely beginning as early as 5,000 BC. A water jar shaped like an avocado, dating to AD 900, was discovered in the pre-Incan city of Chan Chan.

The earliest known written account of the avocado in Europe is that of Martín Fernández de Enciso (circa 1470–1528) in 1519 in his book, Suma De Geographia Que Trata De Todas Las Partidas Y Provincias Del Mundo. The first detailed account that unequivocally describes the avocado was given by Gonzalo Fernández de Oviedo y Valdés in his work  in 1526. The first written record in English of the use of the word 'avocado' was by Hans Sloane, who coined the term, in a 1696 index of Jamaican plants. The plant was introduced to Spain in 1601, Indonesia around 1750, Mauritius in 1780, Brazil in 1809, the United States mainland in 1825, South Africa and Australia in the late 19th century, and the Ottoman Empire in 1908. In the United States, the avocado was introduced to Florida and Hawaii in 1833 and in California in 1856.

Before 1915, the avocado was commonly referred to in California as ahuacate and in Florida as alligator pear. In 1915, the California Avocado Association introduced the then-innovative term avocado to refer to the plant.

Etymology 
The word avocado comes from the Spanish , which derives from the Nahuatl (Mexican) word  , which goes back to the proto-Aztecan . In Molina's Nahuatl dictionary "auacatl" is given also as the translation for compañón "testicle", and this has been taken up in popular culture where a frequent claim is that testicle was the word's original meaning. This is not the case, as the original meaning can be reconstructed rather as "avocado" – rather the word seems to have been used in Nahuatl as a euphemism for "testicle".

The earliest known written use in English is attested from 1697 as avogato pear, later avocado pear (due to its shape), a term sometimes corrupted to alligator pear.

Regional names 
In Central American, Caribbean Spanish-speaking countries, and Spain it is known by the Mexican Spanish name , while South American Spanish-speaking countries Argentina, Chile, Perú and Uruguay use a Quechua-derived word, .

In the United Kingdom the term avocado pear, applied when avocados first became commonly available in the 1960s, is sometimes used.

Originating as a diminutive in Australian English, a clipped form, has since become a common colloquialism in South Africa and the United Kingdom.

It is known as "butter fruit" in parts of India and Hong Kong.

Cultivation 

As a subtropical species, avocados need a climate without frost and with little wind. High winds reduce the humidity, dehydrate the flowers, and affect pollination. The trees also need well-aerated soils, ideally more than 1 m deep. However, Guatemalan varieties such as "MacArthur", "Rincon", or "Nabal" can withstand temperatures down to  

Increasing demand and production of avocados may cause water shortages in some avocado production areas, such as the Mexican state of Michoacán. Avocados may also cause environmental and socioeconomic impacts in major production areas, illegal deforestation, and water disputes. Water requirements for growing avocados are three times higher than for apples, and 18 times higher than for tomatoes.

Harvest and postharvest 
Commercial orchards produce an average of seven tonnes per hectare each year, with some orchards achieving 20 tonnes per hectare. Biennial bearing can be a problem, with heavy crops in one year being followed by poor yields the next.

Like the banana, the avocado is a climacteric fruit, which matures on the tree, but ripens off the tree. Avocados used in commerce are picked hard and green and kept in coolers at  until they reach their final destination. Avocados must be mature to ripen properly. Avocados that fall off the tree ripen on the ground. Generally, the fruit is picked once it reaches maturity; Mexican growers pick 'Hass' avocados when they have more than 23% dry matter, and other producing countries have similar standards. Once picked, avocados ripen in one to two weeks (depending on the cultivar) at room temperature (faster if stored with other fruits such as apples or bananas, because of the influence of ethylene gas). Some supermarkets sell ripened avocados which have been treated with synthetic ethylene to hasten ripening. The use of an ethylene gas "ripening room", which is now an industry standard, was pioneered in the 1980s by farmer Gil Henry of Escondido, California, in response to footage from a hidden supermarket camera which showed shoppers repeatedly squeezing hard, unripe avocados, putting them "back in the bin," and moving on without making a purchase. In some cases, avocados can be left on the tree for several months, which is an advantage to commercial growers who seek the greatest return for their crop, but if the fruit remains unpicked for too long, it falls to the ground.

Breeding

The species is only partially able to self-pollinate because of dichogamy in its flowering. This limitation, added to the long juvenile period, makes the species difficult to breed. Most cultivars are propagated by grafting, having originated from random seedling plants or minor mutations derived from cultivars. Modern breeding programs tend to use isolation plots where the chances of cross-pollination are reduced. That is the case for programs at the University of California, Riverside, as well as the Volcani Centre and the Instituto de Investigaciones Agropecuarias in Chile.

The avocado is unusual in that the timing of the male and female flower phases differs among cultivars. The two flowering types are A and B. A-cultivar flowers open as female on the morning of the first day and close in late morning or early afternoon. Then they open as male in the afternoon of the second day. B varieties open as female on the afternoon of the first day, close in late afternoon and reopen as male the following morning.
 A cultivars: 'Hass', 'Gwen', 'Lamb Hass', 'Pinkerton', 'Reed'
 B cultivars: 'Fuerte', 'Sharwil', 'Zutano', 'Bacon', 'Ettinger', 'Sir Prize', 'Walter Hole'

Certain cultivars, such as the 'Hass', have a tendency to bear well only in alternate years. After a season with a low yield, due to factors such as cold (which the avocado does not tolerate well), the trees tend to produce abundantly the next season. In addition, due to environmental circumstances during some years, seedless avocados may appear on the trees. Known in the avocado industry as "cukes", they are usually discarded commercially due to their small size.

Propagation and rootstocks

Avocados can be propagated by seed, taking roughly four to six years to bear fruit, although in some cases seedlings can take 10 years to come into bearing. The offspring is unlikely to be identical to the parent cultivar in fruit quality. Prime quality varieties are therefore propagated by grafting to rootstocks that are propagated by seed (seedling rootstocks) or by layering (clonal rootstocks). After about a year of growing in a greenhouse, the young rootstocks are ready to be grafted. Terminal and lateral grafting is normally used. The scion cultivar grows for another 6–12 months before the tree is ready to be sold. Clonal rootstocks are selected for tolerance of specific soil and disease conditions, such as poor soil aeration or resistance to the soil-borne disease (root rot) caused by Phytophthora cinnamomi. Advances in cloning techniques that can produce up to 500 new plants from a single millimetre of tree cutting have the potential to increase the availability of rootstocks.

Commercial avocado production is limited to a small fraction of the vast genetic diversity in the species. Conservation of this genetic diversity has relied largely on field collection, as avocado seeds often do not survive storage in seed banks. This is problematic, as field preservation of living cultivars is expensive, and habitat loss threatens wild cultivars. More recently, an alternate method of conservation has been developed based on cryopreservation of avocado somatic embryos with reliable methods for somatic embryogenesis and reconstitution into living trees.

As a houseplant

The avocado tree can be grown domestically and used as a decorative houseplant. The pit germinates in normal soil conditions or partially submerged in a small glass (or container) of water. In the latter method, the pit sprouts in four to six weeks, at which time it is planted in standard houseplant potting soil. The plant normally grows large enough to be prunable; it does not bear fruit unless it has ample sunlight. Home gardeners can graft a branch from a fruit-bearing plant to speed maturity, which typically takes four to six years to bear fruit.

Pests and diseases

Avocado trees are vulnerable to bacterial, viral, fungal, and nutritional diseases (excesses and deficiencies of key minerals). Disease can affect all parts of the plant, causing spotting, rotting, cankers, pitting, and discoloration. The pyriform scale insect (Protopulvinaria pyriformis) is known from Australia, South Africa, Israel, Italy, France, Spain, Cuba, Florida, and Peru. It is normally found on avocado, and in Peru it is said to be the worst insect pest of the fruit. Certain cultivars of avocado seem more susceptible to attack by the scale than others.

Cultivation by location

Cultivation in Mexico

Mexico is by far the world's largest avocado growing country, producing several times more than the second largest producer. In 2013, the total area dedicated to avocado production was 188,723 hectares (415,520 acres), and the harvest was 2.03 million tonnes in 2017. The states that produce the most are México, Morelos, Nayarit, Puebla, and Michoacan, accounting for 86% of the total. In Michoacán, the cultivation is complicated by the existence of drug cartels that extort protection fees from cultivators. They are reported to exact 2,000 Mexican pesos per hectare from avocado farmers and 1 to 3 pesos/kg of harvested fruit. It is such a problem that the phrase blood guacamole, has been adopted to describe the social effects in Mexico of the vast worldwide demand for its fruits.

Cultivation in California

The avocado was introduced from Mexico to California in the 19th century, and has become a successful cash crop. About  – as of 2015, some 80% of United States avocado production – is located in Southern California, with 60% in San Diego County.

Avocado is the official fruit of the state of California. Fallbrook, California, claims, without official recognition, the title of "Avocado Capital of the World" (also claimed by the town of Uruapan in Mexico), and both it and Carpinteria, California, host annual avocado festivals.

The California Avocado Commission and the California Avocado Society are the two major grower organizations and Calavo Growers is a major distributor.

Cultivation in Peru
'Hass' avocado production in Peru encompasses thousands of hectares in central and western Peru. Peru has now become the largest supplier of avocados imported to the European Union and the second largest supplier to Asia and the United States. The country's location near the equator and along the Pacific Ocean creates consistently mild temperatures all year.

'Hass' avocados from Peru are seasonally available to consumers from May through September and are promoted under the auspices of the Peruvian Avocado Commission, headquartered in Washington, D.C.

Cultivation in Chile

Chile has produced avocados for over 100 years with production increasing dramatically in the early 1980s due to global demand. New York magazine reported in 2015 that "Large avocado growers are draining the country's groundwater and rivers faster than they can replenish themselves." 88% of total production and 99% of exported avocados from Chile are Hass avocados. Avocados are a staple fruit in Chile with 30% of production destined for the domestic market. The country pays zero important tariffs with the China, United States, and the European Union, due to free trade agreements.

Cultivars

A cultivars

 'Choquette':  A seedling from Miami, Florida. 'Choquette' bore large fruit of good eating quality in large quantities and had good disease resistance, and thus became a major cultivar. Today 'Choquette' is widely propagated in south Florida both for commercial growing and for home growing.
 'Gwen': A seedling bred from 'Hass' x 'Thille' in 1982, 'Gwen' is higher yielding and more dwarfing than 'Hass' in California. The fruit has an oval shape, slightly smaller than 'Hass', with a rich, nutty flavor. The skin texture is more finely pebbled than 'Hass', and is dull green when ripe.
 'Hass':  The 'Hass' is the most common cultivar of avocado. It produces fruit year-round and accounts for 80% of cultivated avocados in the world. All 'Hass' trees are descended from a single "mother tree" raised by a mail carrier named Rudolph Hass, of La Habra Heights, California. Hass patented the productive tree in 1935. The "mother tree", of uncertain subspecies, died of root rot and was cut down in September 2002. 
 'Lula': A seedling reportedly grown from a 'Taft' avocado planted in Miami on the property of George Cellon, it is named after Cellon's wife, Lula. It was likely a cross between Mexican and Guatemalan types. 'Lula' was recognized for its flavor and high oil content and propagated commercially in Florida. 
 'Maluma': A relatively new cultivar, it was discovered in South Africa in the early 1990s by Mr. A.G. (Dries) Joubert. It is a chance seedling of unknown parentage.
 'Pinkerton': First grown on the Pinkerton Ranch in Saticoy, California, in the early 1970s, 'Pinkerton' is a seedling of 'Hass' x 'Rincon'. The large fruit has a small seed, and its green skin deepens in color as it ripens. The thick flesh has a smooth, creamy texture, pale green color, good flavor, and high oil content. A hybrid Guatemalan type, it has excellent peeling characteristics.
 'Reed': Developed from a chance seedling found in 1948 by James S. Reed in California, this cultivar has large, round, green fruit with a smooth texture and dark, thick, glossy skin. Smooth and delicate, the flesh has a slightly nutty flavor. The skin ripens green.

B cultivars

 'Fuerte': Commercialized in the U.S. from budwood imported from Atlixco, Mexico in 1911, Fuerte was the dominant commercial variety in the U.S. for the first half of the 20th century.
 'Sharwil': Developed by James Cockburn Wilson (died 1990) with Frank Victor Sharpe in Tamborine Mountain, Queensland, Australia in the 1950s, a portmanteau of Sharpe and Wilson. Wilson also developed the Willard variety (Wilson and Hazzard), imported the Reed variety into Australia, and developed the Shepard variety.  Sharpe  was later awarded a CMG in 1972 for services to the avocado industry.  The variety originated in Guatemala.

Other cultivars
Other avocado cultivars include 'Spinks'. Historically attested varieties (which may or may not survive among horticulturists) include the 'Challenge', 'Dickinson', 'Kist', 'Queen', 'Rey', 'Royal', 'Sharpless', and 'Taft'.

Stoneless avocado
A stoneless avocado, marketed as a "cocktail avocado", which does not contain a pit, is available on a limited basis. They are five to eight centimetres long; the whole fruit may be eaten, including the skin. It is produced from an unpollinated blossom in which the seed does not develop. Seedless avocados regularly appear on trees. Known in the avocado industry as "cukes", they are usually discarded commercially due to their small size.

Production

In 2020, world production of avocados was 8.1 million tonnes, led by Mexico with 30% (2.4 million tonnes) of the total (table). Other major producers were Colombia, Dominican Republic, Peru, and Indonesia, together producing 35% of the world total. Despite market effects of the 2020 COVID-19 pandemic, volume production of avocados in Mexico increased by 40% over 2019 levels.

In 2018, the US Department of Agriculture estimated that  in total were under cultivation for avocado production in Mexico, a 6% increase over the previous year, and that 2 million tonnes would be exported. The Mexican state of Michoacán is the world leader in avocado production, accounting for 80% of all Mexican output. Most Mexican growers produce the Hass variety due to its longer shelf life for shipping and high demand among consumers.

Market
Seventy-six percent of Mexico's avocado exports go to the United States, with the free trade agreement between the US, Canada and Mexico in July 2020 facilitating avocado shipments within the North American free trade zone. The Mexican domestic market was expanding during 2020. Mexican avocado exports are challenged by growth of production by Peru and the Dominican Republic to supply the US and European markets.

During the COVID-19 pandemic, Mexican avocado farmers restricted harvesting as the overall demand and supply chain slowed due to labor and shipping restrictions. Later in 2020, demand in the United States and within Mexico increased at a time when American retail prices continued to rise. During 2020 in the United States, month-to-month volume sales of avocados were similar to those of tomatoes at about 250 million pounds (110 million kg) per month. A report issued in mid-2020 forecast that the worldwide market, which was US$13.7 billion in 2018, would recover after the end of the pandemic and rise to US$21.6 billion by 2026.

Culinary uses

The fruit of horticultural cultivars has a markedly higher fat content than most other fruit, mostly monounsaturated fat, and as such serves as an important staple in the diet of consumers who have limited access to other fatty foods (high-fat meats and fish, dairy products). Having a high smoke point, avocado oil is expensive compared to common salad and cooking oils, and is mostly used for salads or dips.

A ripe avocado yields to gentle pressure when held in the palm of the hand and squeezed. The flesh is prone to enzymatic browning, quickly turning brown after exposure to air. To prevent this, lime or lemon juice can be added to avocados after peeling.

The fruit is not sweet, but distinctly and subtly flavored, with smooth texture. It is used in both savory and sweet dishes, though in many countries not for both. The avocado is common in vegetarian cuisine as a substitute for meats in sandwiches and salads because of its high fat content.

Generally, avocado is served raw, though some cultivars, including the common 'Hass', can be cooked for a short time without becoming bitter. The flesh of some avocados may be rendered inedible by heat. Prolonged cooking induces this chemical reaction in all cultivars.

It is used as the base for the Mexican dip known as guacamole, as well as a spread on corn tortillas or toast, served with spices. Avocado is a primary ingredient in avocado soup. Avocado slices are frequently added to hamburgers and tortas and is a key ingredient in California rolls and other makizushi ("maki", or rolled sushi).

In various countries
In Mexico and Central America, avocados are served mixed with white rice, in soups, salads, or on the side of chicken and meat. They are also commonly added to pozole. In Peru, they are consumed with tequeños as mayonnaise, served as a side dish with parrillas, used in salads and sandwiches, or as a whole dish when filled with tuna, shrimp, or chicken. In Chile, it is used as a puree-like sauce with chicken, hamburgers, and hot dogs; and in slices for celery or lettuce salads. The Chilean version of Caesar salad contains large slices of mature avocado.

Avocados in savory dishes, often seen as exotic, are a relative novelty in Portuguese-speaking countries, such as Brazil, where the traditional preparation is mashed with sugar and lime, and eaten as a dessert or snack. This contrasts with Spanish-speaking countries such as Chile, Mexico, or Argentina, where the opposite is true and sweet preparations are rare. With the exception of the Philippines, a former Spanish colony where avocados are traditionally used in sweet preparations and savory uses are seen as exotic.

In the Philippines (where avocados were introduced from Mexico since before the 1700s), Brazil, Indonesia, Vietnam, and southern India (especially the coastal Kerala, Tamil Nadu and Karnataka region), avocados are frequently used for milkshakes and occasionally added to ice cream and other desserts. In Brazil, the Philippines Vietnam, and Indonesia, a dessert drink is made with sugar, milk or water, and pureed avocado. Chocolate syrup is sometimes added. In Morocco, a similar chilled avocado and milk drink is sweetened with confectioner's sugar and flavored with a touch of orange flower water.

In Ethiopia, avocados are made into juice by mixing them with sugar and milk or water, usually served with Vimto and a slice of lemon. It is also common to serve layered multiple fruit juices in a glass (locally called Spris) made of avocados, mangoes, bananas, guavas, and papayas. Avocados are also used to make salads. In Kenya and Nigeria, the avocado is often eaten as a fruit alone or mixed with other fruits in a fruit salad, or as part of a vegetable salad. In Ghana, they are often eaten alone on sliced bread as a sandwich. In Sri Lanka, their well-ripened flesh, thoroughly mashed or pureed with milk and kitul treacle (a liquid jaggery made from the sap of the inflorescence of jaggery palms), is a common dessert. In Haiti, they are often consumed with cassava or regular bread for breakfast.

In the United Kingdom, the avocado became available during the 1960s when introduced by Sainsbury's under the name 'avocado pear'. Much of the success of avocados in the UK is attributed to a long-running promotional campaign initiated by South African growers in 1995. In Australia and New Zealand, avocados are commonly served on sandwiches, sushi, toast, or with chicken.

Leaves

In addition to the fruit, the leaves of Mexican avocados (Persea americana var. drymifolia) are used in some cuisines as a spice, with a flavor somewhat reminiscent of anise. They are sold both dried and fresh, toasted before use, and either crumbled or used whole, commonly in bean dishes. Leaves of P. americana, Guatemalan variety, are toxic to goats, sheep, and horses.

Nutrition and health

Nutrients
Raw avocado flesh is 73% water, 15% fat, 9% carbohydrates, and 2% protein (table). In a 100 gram reference amount, avocado supplies 160 calories, and is a rich source (20% or more of the Daily Value, DV) of several B vitamins (such as 28% DV in pantothenic acid) and vitamin K (20% DV), with moderate contents (10–19% DV) of vitamin C, vitamin E, and potassium. Avocados also contain phytosterols and carotenoids, such as lutein and zeaxanthin.

Fat composition
Avocados have diverse fats. For a typical one:

 About 75% of an avocado's energy comes from fat, most of which (67% of total fat) is monounsaturated fat as oleic acid (table).
 Other predominant fats include palmitic acid and linoleic acid.
 The saturated fat content amounts to 14% of the total fat. 
 Typical total fat composition is roughly: 1% ω-3, 14% ω-6, 71% ω-9 (65% oleic and 6% palmitoleic), and 14% saturated fat (palmitic acid).

Although costly to produce, nutrient-rich avocado oil has a multitude of uses for salads or cooking and in cosmetics and soap products.

Research
In 2022, a prospective cohort study following 110,487 people for 30 years found that eating two servings of avocado per week reduced the risk of developing cardiovascular diseases by 16–22%. The study involved replacing half a daily serving of saturated fat sources, including margarine, butter, egg, yogurt, cheese, or processed meats, with an equivalent amount of avocado.

Allergies
Some people have allergic reactions to avocado. There are two main forms of allergy: those with a tree-pollen allergy develop local symptoms in the mouth and throat shortly after eating avocado; the second, known as latex-fruit syndrome, is related to latex allergy and symptoms include generalised urticaria, abdominal pain, and vomiting and can sometimes be life-threatening.

Toxicity to animals
Avocado leaves, bark, skin, or pit are documented to be harmful to animals; cats, dogs, cattle, goats, rabbits, rats, guinea pigs, birds, fish, and horses can be severely harmed or even killed when they consume them. The avocado fruit is poisonous to some birds, and the American Society for the Prevention of Cruelty to Animals (ASPCA) lists it as toxic to horses.

Avocado leaves contain a toxic fatty acid derivative, persin, which in sufficient quantity can cause colic in horses and without veterinary treatment, death. The symptoms include gastrointestinal irritation, vomiting, diarrhea, respiratory distress, congestion, fluid accumulation around the tissues of the heart, and even death. Birds also seem to be particularly sensitive to this toxic compound.

A line of US-produced dog and cat food, AvoDerm, uses oils and meal made from avocado meat as main ingredients.

See also

 California Avocado Commission
 California Avocado Society
 Florida Lime & Avocado Growers, Inc. v. Paul
 Guacamole
 List of avocado dishes
 Plant propagation
 Recalcitrant seed

Explanatory notes

References

Further reading

External links

 Definitive illustrated list of avocado varieties
 California Avocado Commission
 Avocados beyond Persea americana, California Rare Fruit Growers

 
Crops originating from Mexico
Crops originating from South America
Crops originating from the Americas
Fruit trees
Persea
Trees of Belize
Trees of Costa Rica
Trees of Guatemala
Trees of Honduras
Trees of Mexico
Trees of Nicaragua
Tropical agriculture
Tropical fruit
Cloud forest flora of Mexico